Himmo, King of Jerusalem (Hebrew: חימו מלך ירושלים, tr. Himmo Melech Yerushalaim) is a 1987 Israeli independent underground dramatic art film directed by Amos Guttman.

Plot
A young and beautiful volunteer nurse, Hamutal Horowitz (Alona Kimhi), is romantically drawn to the enigmatic Himmo Perach (Ofer Shikartsi), a mortally wounded and mutilated soldier and former charismatic philanderer who cannot speak (except when he asks to be shot, though nobody in the monastery has the courage to do so) or move as he had most of his limbs removed without anesthesia due to severe shortages. Jealousy amongst the other patients, all in love with Hamutal though receiving only professional care, soon begins to emerge.

Cast
Icho Avital as Yoram
Shay Capon as Aaron
Amiram Gabriel as Frangi
Alona Kimhi as Hamital
Amos Lavi as Marcos
Dov Navon as Assa
Aliza Rosen as Clara
Sivan Shavit as Ivria
Yossi Graber as doctor
Ada Valerie-Tal
Ofer Shikartsi
Avi Gilor

Reception
It was screened and won several prizes at the 1988 Toronto International Film Festival, San Francisco International Film Festival, Haifa International Film Festival, and 1988 Chicago International Film Festival, despite being a commercial flop with only 21,000 tickets sold.

Outside Israel, where the film was distributed by the National Center for Jewish Film, TV Guide also dismissed the "stagy, with a fair amount of speechmaking" approach. Several nowadays notable Israeli film people, such as Rony Gruber, Samuel Maoz, Shva Salhoov, and  started out as crew bit parts on this film.

References

Bibliography
. 
Himmo, King of Jerusalem. In:  Reprinted in:

External links

1980s historical drama films
1987 independent films
Films about amputees
Films about military personnel
Films about the Israel Defense Forces
Films based on Israeli novels
Films directed by Amos Guttman
Films set in 1948
Films set in Jerusalem
Films set in religious buildings and structures
Films shot in Israel
Israeli historical drama films
Israeli independent films
Medical-themed films
Films set in monasteries
1987 drama films